Adriana Elisabeth "Jannie/Janny" de Groot (born 4 January 1930) is a retired Dutch swimmer. In 1947 and 1950 she won the national titles and became third in the 200 m breaststroke at the European Aquatics Championships. She competed in the same event at the 1948 Summer Olympics and finished fifth in the final won by Dutch teammate Nel van Vliet. Jannie's brother, Daan de Groot (1933–1982), was an Olympic cyclist.

References

1930 births
Living people
Dutch female breaststroke swimmers
Olympic swimmers of the Netherlands
Swimmers at the 1948 Summer Olympics
Swimmers from Amsterdam
European Aquatics Championships medalists in swimming